The Long Plain First Nation is an Ojibway and Dakota First Nations band government whose reserve is located in the Central Plains Region of Manitoba, Canada. Its reserve lands include the Long Plain Reserve #6, the Keeshkeemaquah Reserve near Portage La Prairie, and the Madison Indian Reserve #1—the first urban reserve in Winnipeg.

It is located to the southwest of Portage la Prairie along the Assiniboine River. It lies between the Rural Municipality of Portage la Prairie and the Rural Municipality of South Norfolk, and also borders another band's reserve, that of the Dakota Plains First Nation.

The current chief of the Long Plain First Nation is Kyra Wilson; who is the second female Chief in Long Plain history.

Reserves 

The First Nation has 3 reserve lands:

 Keeshkeemaquah Reserve — located near Portage La Prairie. These lands were originally used as the site of a residential school called Portage la Prairie Presbyterian Indian Residential School, whose building was renovated in 1984 and became home to the Yellowquill College (before the college moved to Winnipeg in 2000). In 2000, the Long Plain First Nation Council entered into a 50-year head lease (now extended to 75 years) with Arrowhead Development Corp. The lands were designated for education and training purposes, later allowing for ancillary purposes. Today, the lands are subleased to the Keeshkeemaquah Conference and Gaming Centre, Miskwaanakwadook Place, Arrowhead Gas Bar, Rufus Prince Building, White Cross Drugs and Walk-in Clinic, and Long Plain Housing Authority.
 Madison Indian Reserve #1 — an urban reserve located in Winnipeg, to the west of the Polo Park Shopping Centre, this property was purchased from Manitoba Hydro in 2006. With the land spanning , the purchase included a  building,  asphalt parking lot, and an additional  gravel parking lot. In 2011, a significant portion of the building was renovated and leased to the Yellowquill College Inc.; the remaining space was renovated in 2012 for office space and was leased to Aboriginal Peoples Television Network, Manito Ahbee, Eagle Vision, and Manitoba Treaty Commission Office. In 2013, the site officially attained reserve status and became the first urban reserve in Winnipeg.

Community and amenities 
Long Plain First Nation owns and operates Rez Radio 101.7 FM, which services the Long Plain community.

Long Plain First Nation Annual Pow-wow began in 1876 and is one of Manitoba's longest running pow-wow celebrations. The contest usually occurs during August long weekend from Friday evening to Sunday night.

Residents of the region have included artist Linus Woods.

The Long Plain First Nation operates the Long Plain School (Kindergarten to Grade 8). The original campus of Yellowquill College was located in the building that was previously used as the Portage La Prairie Presbyterian Indian Residential School on the Keeshkeemaquah Reserve. The Yellowquill College has a Mature Student High School Diploma program on the Long Plain Reserve #6.

See also
 Aboriginal peoples in Manitoba

References

External links
Long Plain First Nation
Map of Long Plain 6 (part in Census Division No. 9) at Statcan

First Nations governments in Manitoba
Ojibwe governments
First Nations in Southern Manitoba